The New Blue Party of Ontario (abbr. New Blue) is a minor socially conservative political party in the Canadian province of Ontario. Founded in 2020, the party is led by Jim Karahalios, the husband of Belinda Karahalios, the party's first MPP.

History

Prior to the party's formation
In late 2017, Jim Karahalios, a corporate lawyer, was sued by the Progressive Conservative Party of Ontario in retaliation for Karahalios's founding the activist groups "Axe The Carbon Tax" (opposing the party's pro-carbon tax position) and "Take Back Our PC Party" (challenging the party's acceptance of nominations that resulted in allegations of electoral fraud).  Karahalios won the lawsuit when Superior Court Justice Paul Perell wrote a decision against the party, ruling that the lawsuit was a "strategic lawsuit against public participation” intended to stifle dissent.

In 2018, following the resignation of Patrick Brown and the election of Doug Ford as Ontario PC Party leader, Belinda Karahalios ran for and won the party's nomination in the riding of Cambridge. and in the 2018 Ontario election she was elected MPP for the riding.

In November 2018, Jim Karahalios ran for the presidency of the Ontario Progressive Conservative Party and later filed a lawsuit against the party after his defeat, alleging the election process was manipulated, election rules were breached and that ballot boxes were allegedly stuffed in order to elect his competitor, Brian Patterson, who was endorsed by Doug Ford.

On July 21, 2020, Belinda Karahalios was expelled from the Progressive Conservative caucus by Doug Ford after voting against Bill 195, the Reopening Ontario (A Flexible Response to COVID-19) Act, which would expand the government's emergency authority during the COVID-19 pandemic. Karahalios voted against the legislation, calling it an "unnecessary overreach on our parliamentary democracy." A month later, Belinda Karahalios, her husband Jim, and 18 other members of the Ontario PC Party were removed from the Cambridge PC Riding Association Board as a result of the party executive, led by Brian Patterson, voting to "de-register" the riding association with Elections Ontario.

After the party's formation

On October 12, 2020, Jim and Belinda Karahalios released a video announcing that they were forming a new political party, claiming that the Ontario PC Party was beyond redemption. Stating that there "is no party in the Ontario legislature defending the taxpayer, defending small business, defending places of worship, promoting freedom, promoting democracy or fighting political corruption."

On January 7, 2021, the New Blue Party was officially registered by Elections Ontario. Party leader Jim Karahalios stated that the party would focus on supporting the taxpayer, places of worship and small business. The party won no seats in the 2022 provincial election.

Ideology and principles

Ideology 

The New Blue Party is a right-wing, social conservative party that has been described as being to the right of the Progressive Conservative Party of Ontario from which it split. The party has publicly opposed all measures taken against COVID-19; at least one of the party's candidates for the 2022 Ontario general election took part in the Canada convoy protest.

An article in the Simcoe Reformer described the New Blue party as being against "woke activism" and in favour of removing critical race theory and "gender identity theory" from schools.

Election results

 One New Blue candidate in Ottawa West—Nepean was deregistered on May 17, 2022, due to Canadian military rules.

References 

2020 establishments in Ontario
Conservative parties in Canada
Political parties established in 2020
Political schisms
Provincial political parties in Ontario
Right-wing populism in Canada
Politics of Cambridge, Ontario
Organizations established for the COVID-19 pandemic
Cambridge, Ontario
Social conservative parties